Shining Through is a 1992 American World War II drama film which was released to United States cinemas on January 31, 1992, written and directed by David Seltzer and starring Michael Douglas and Melanie Griffith, with Liam Neeson, Joely Richardson and John Gielgud in supporting roles. It is based on the novel of the same name by Susan Isaacs. The original music score was composed by Michael Kamen.

Plot
In the present (1992), elderly Linda Voss (Melanie Griffith) is interviewed by a BBC documentary team about her experiences before and during World War II. She explains that, growing up in New York City as a young woman of Irish/German Jewish parentage, she always dreamed of visiting Berlin and finding her family members there. In 1940, Linda applies for a job as a secretary with a major law firm, but is rejected because she did not graduate from a prestigious women's college. As she leaves, however, Linda impresses the supervisor by demonstrating that she speaks fluent German, and she is hired as a translator for Ed Leland (Michael Douglas), a humorless attorney. She soon becomes suspicious of his strange behavior and mysterious whereabouts, and begins to suspect that he is actually a spy, and they eventually become lovers. After the attack on Pearl Harbor, when America joins the war with the Allies, Ed emerges as a colonel in the OSS. Linda accompanies him to Washington D.C., but he is suddenly posted away, leaving her alone and devastated. Assigned to work in the War Department, she hears nothing of Ed until one evening in a night club, when he reappears with an attractive female officer. Reluctant to resume their affair, he does re-employ her. Ed and his colleagues need to replace a murdered agent in Berlin on very short notice. Despite knowing little about intelligence work, Linda volunteers and Ed is persuaded by her fluent German and passion to contribute to the war effort. Her mission is to bring back data on the V-1 flying bomb.

Ed and Linda travel to Switzerland, where he hands her over to master spy Konrad Friedrichs (John Gielgud), who takes her by train across the border into Germany, to Berlin, where he hides her in his house and introduces her to his niece, Margrete von Eberstein (Joely Richardson), a socialite also working as an Allied agent. Linda assumes the identity of Lina Albrecht, and is planted as a cook in the household of Horst Drescher, a social-climbing Nazi officer, before an important party he is throwing, but she arrives too late to prepare the food properly, causing the dinner to be a disaster, and Drescher angrily fires her. Walking dejectedly on the dark street, alone, after curfew, Linda chances to encounter a guest from the dinner, officer Franze-Otto Dietrich (Liam Neeson), who is charmed by her and mistakenly assumes she must already have had a security check. Dietrich is a widower and takes Linda/"Lina" on as a nanny to his two children. Between her duties as a servant, she searches Dietrich's house for confidential papers on the V1, which he is also working on. She intends to photograph them, but can find nothing. Meanwhile, Ed, sick with worry about Linda since her disappearance from Drescher's party, suddenly chances to see her in a newsreel of Hitler in a parade in Berlin. Ed's agents identify Dietrich as the man standing next to Linda in the film, and Ed heads to Germany to rescue her. Because he does not speak German, he assumes the identity of a wounded high-ranking German officer, who has had his throat injured and cannot speak. He tracks down Linda and tells her she must leave with him immediately, but Linda reveals that she has located her Jewish cousins, excitedly telling Ed and Margrete how nearby they are. She demands Ed give her another day to visit them and give them hope. The next day, with the children in her care, Linda tracks down her relatives' hiding place in the city, but she finds it empty and ransacked, they have just been captured. When an allied air raid suddenly hits, Linda has to run for cover with the children and protect them, and when they get back to the house, the frightened boy inadvertently reveals the existence of a hidden room in Dietrich's basement. Linda sneaks down there that night and finds and surreptitiously photographs Dietrich's top secret V-1 rocket blueprints. Dietrich has fallen in love with Linda, and invites her to the opera. While there, Linda's cover is blown when Margrete's mother recognizes her, believing Linda to be a friend of her daughter's from college. Dietrich is heartbroken and, once back at his house, Linda sees him loading his gun.

Fearing for her life, Linda flees across the city, still in her ballgown, and finds sanctuary with Margrete. When Margrete thinks Linda is not looking, she uses the phone to report in to her superiors, but Linda catches her. Margrete reveals that she is a double agent, who betrayed the agent Linda replaced, causing his death, and that she gave away the location of Linda's Jewish cousins to the Gestapo. Margrete shoots Linda, wounding her, but they struggle and Linda overpowers Margrete and kills her. Linda hides in the laundry chute, escaping the German forces who raid Margrete's apartment. Badly wounded, Linda is found by Ed and Friedrichs, who take her to the railway station. Ed and Linda travel to the Swiss-German border. Linda is unconscious from blood loss, barely alive, and Ed's travel papers have expired. Ed's mute act fails to sway the border guards, forcing him to shoot his way out. Carrying Linda, he struggles towards the border. The German sniper guarding it shoots and wounds him twice, but he gets himself and Linda across before collapsing. Back in the present, Linda reveals that while she and Ed recovered from their injuries in a Swiss hospital, the microfilm of the secret German documents was retrieved from a hiding place inside her glove, and the Allies successfully bombed the V1 installation. Ed then walks out to join the interview, and they reveal they have been happily married ever since.

Cast
 Michael Douglas as Ed Leland
 Melanie Griffith as Linda Voss
 Liam Neeson as General Franze-Otto Dietrich
 Joely Richardson as Margrete von Eberstein
 John Gielgud as Konrad Friedrichs  Sunflower
 Francis Guinan as Andrew Berringer
 Anthony Walters as Dietrich's son
 Victoria Shalet as Dietrich's daughter
 Sheila Allen as Olga Leiner, Margrete's mother
 Stanley Beard as Linda's father
 Sylvia Syms as Linda's mother
  as Horst Drescher
 Hansi Jochmann as Hedda Drescher
 Mathieu Carrière as Capt. Von Haefler
 William Hope as Major Kernohan
 Constanze Engelbrecht as Stafson Von Neest
 Ludwig Haas as Adolf Hitler
 Wolf Kahler as German Border Commandant

Production
The film was first announced in the fall of 1988, just after the publication of the novel. It was to be written and directed by Seltzer, produced at Columbia Pictures and would likely star Debra Winger. By late 1989, just after the fall of the Berlin Wall, Seltzer and producer Rosenman were reported to be scouting potential locations in East Berlin, Warsaw, Krakow, and Budapest, and Meg Ryan and Michelle Pfeiffer were reported to be top contenders for the lead role. The production moved soon after to Twentieth Century Fox, and in February 1990, it was announced that Melanie Griffith had been cast.  After permission was secured to shoot the film on location in East Germany, the majority of it was shot in Berlin and Potsdam starting in October 1990, just as Germany was being reunified. Studio work was done at the DEFA Studios, the state film studios of East Germany.

Because all of Berlin's great train stations were destroyed in World War II, the production traveled over 100 miles to Leipzig at the end of October to shoot scenes in the Leipzig Hauptbahnhof terminus, built in 1915 and the largest in Europe. This was prior to the building's modernization by the Deutsche Bahn.

The finale, set at a border crossing and involving a period train, was shot in Maria Elend, Carinthia, Austria in November, 1990.

The New York City and Washington scenes at the beginning of the film were shot in and around London and at nearby Pinewood Studios. Locations included the Old Royal Naval College in Greenwich, Hammersmith, and St Pancras Station, which doubled for Zurich Station for a brief sequence set in Switzerland.

Reception
The film was neither a commercial nor a critical success. The Razzie Awards declared Shining Through the Worst Picture of 1992, with Melanie Griffith being voted Worst Actress (also for her performance in A Stranger Among Us) and David Seltzer for Worst Director. It also received nominations for Michael Douglas as Worst Actor (also for Basic Instinct) and for Seltzer in the category of Worst Screenplay. The film holds a 41% rating on Rotten Tomatoes based on 17 reviews.

Roger Ebert wrote in the Chicago Sun-Times, "I know it's only a movie, and so perhaps I should be willing to suspend my disbelief, but Shining Through is such an insult to the intelligence that I wasn't able to do that. Here is a film in which scene after scene is so implausible that the movie kept pushing me outside and making me ask how the key scenes could possibly be taken seriously."

Janet Maslin wrote in The New York Times that the first three-quarters of Susan Isaacs's book "never made it to the screen," including Linda Voss's love affair and marriage to her New York law firm boss, John Berringer. "David Seltzer's film version of Shining Through manages to lose also the humor of Susan Isaacs's savvy novel. Even stranger than that is the film's insistence on jettisoning the most enjoyable parts of the story."

The film is listed in Golden Raspberry Award founder John Wilson's book The Official Razzie Movie Guide as one of The 100 Most Enjoyably Bad Movies Ever Made.

References

External links
 
 
 
 

 

1992 films
1990s German-language films
1992 romantic drama films
20th Century Fox films
American romantic drama films
American spy drama films
American war drama films
British romantic drama films
British spy drama films
British war drama films
Films about Nazi Germany
Films based on American novels
Films based on romance novels
Films scored by Michael Kamen
Films directed by David Seltzer
Films set in Berlin
Films shot at Pinewood Studios
Golden Raspberry Award winning films
War romance films
World War II spy films
Works about women in war
1990s English-language films
1990s American films
1990s British films
1992 multilingual films
American multilingual films
British multilingual films